The Nazgûl (from Black Speech , "ring", and , "wraith, spirit"), introduced as Black Riders and also called Ringwraiths,  Dark Riders, the Nine Riders, or simply the Nine, are fictional characters in J. R. R. Tolkien's Middle-earth. They were nine Men who had succumbed to Sauron's power through wearing Rings of Power, which gave them immortality but reduced them to invisible wraiths, servants bound to the power of the One Ring and completely under Sauron's control.

The Lord of the Rings calls them Sauron's "most terrible servants". Their leader, known as the Lord of the Nazgûl or the Witch-king of Angmar, had once been the King of Angmar in the north of Eriador. At the end of the Third Age, their main stronghold was the city of Minas Morgul at the entrance to Sauron's realm, Mordor. They dress entirely in black. In their early forays, they ride on black horses; later they ride flying monsters, which Tolkien described as "pterodactylic". Their main weapon is terror, though in their pursuit of the Ring-bearer Frodo, their leader uses a Morgul-knife which would reduce its victim to a wraith, and they carry ordinary swords. In his final battle, the Lord of the Nazgûl attacks Éowyn with a mace. The hobbit Merry stabs him with an ancient enchanted Númenórean blade, allowing Éowyn to kill him with her sword. 

Commentators have written that the Nazgûl serve on the ordinary level of story as dangerous opponents; at the romantic level as the enemies of the heroic protagonists; and at the mythic level, where the Lord of the Nazgûl calls himself Death and bursts the gates of Minas Tirith with magical spells. The prophecy that the Lord of the Nazgûl would not die by the hand of man echoes that made of Macbeth in Shakespeare's play.

The Nazgûl appear in numerous adaptations of Tolkien's writings, including animated and live-action films and computer games. Species of several different kinds of animal, including an ant, a crustacean, and a parasitoid wasp, have been named after them.

Fictional history

Second Age 

The Nazgûl or Ringwraiths (Quenya plural: Úlairi) first appeared in the Second Age, according to the "Akallabêth" in The Silmarillion. The Dark Lord Sauron gave nine of the Rings of Power to powerful mortal men, including "it is said" three lords of the once-powerful island realm of Númenor, along with kings of countries in Middle-earth. 

The Silmarillion states in "Of the Rings of Power and the Third Age" that the rings enslaved their bearers to the power of Sauron's Ring, into which he had put much of his own power. The corrupting effect of the rings extended the bearers' earthly lives far beyond their normal lifespans. 

The Nazgûl had a sharp sense of smell. The Lord of the Rings states that their sight worked differently, too: "They themselves do not see the world of light as we do, but our shapes cast shadows in their minds, which only the noon sun destroys; and in the dark they perceive many signs and forms that are hidden from us: then they are most to be feared." Their chief weapon was terror; it was so powerful that Sauron faced one disadvantage when using them: they could not easily travel in secret. Tolkien added, in Unfinished Tales, that the terror they spread was greater when they were unclad and invisible; and when they were gathered together.

Few of the Nazgûl are named or identified individually in Tolkien's works. Their chief, also known as the Lord of the Nazgûl and the Black Captain, appears as the Witch-king of Angmar during the Third Age, instrumental in the destruction of the North-kingdom of Arnor. In Unfinished Tales, his second-in-command is named as Khamûl, the "Black Easterling" or the "Shadow of the East". Three of the Nazgûl were great Númenórean lords; in his notes for translators, Tolkien speculated that the Witch-king of Angmar, ruler of a northern kingdom with its capital at Carn Dûm, was of Númenórean origin.

The nine, as Nazgûl, were soon established as Sauron's principal servants. They were dispersed after the first overthrow of Sauron late in the Second Age at the hands of the Last Alliance of Elves and Men, but their survival was assured by the power of the One Ring.

Third Age 

The appendices to The Lord of the Rings state that the Nazgûl re-emerged over a thousand years later in the Third Age, when the Lord of the Nazgûl led Sauron's forces against the successor kingdoms of Arnor: Rhudaur, Cardolan, and Arthedain. He effectively destroyed all of these, but was eventually defeated by the Elf-lord Glorfindel, who put him to flight, and made the prophecy that "not by the hand of man will he fall". He escaped, and returned to Mordor. There, he gathered the other Nazgûl in preparation for the return of Sauron to that realm.

The Nazgûl besieged Minas Ithil, a fortress located in a valley in the Ephel Duath once belonging to the kingdom of Gondor, and, after two years, captured it and acquired its palantír for Sauron. The city thereafter became Minas Morgul, the stronghold of the Nazgûl, and the valley was henceforth known as Morgul Vale (Imlad Morgul). Sauron returned from Dol Guldur in Mirkwood to Mordor late in the Third Age and declared himself openly. He sent two or three of the Nazgûl to garrison Dol Guldur.

By the time of the main narrative of The Lord of the Rings, Sauron had already learned from Gollum that a hobbit, Bilbo Baggins of the Shire, had acquired the One Ring. Sauron entrusted its recovery to the Nazgûl. They reappeared "west of the River", riding black horses that were bred or trained in Mordor to endure their terror. They learned that the Ring had passed to Bilbo's heir, Frodo, and hunted him and his companions across the Shire; the hobbits heard what seemed to be snuffling, and sometimes saw them crawling or crouching. The hobbits escaped, via Tom Bombadil's realm of the Old Forest where they were not pursued, to Bree. A Ranger of the North, Aragorn, arrived ahead of them and for some days led the hobbits on paths not closely followed by the Ringwraiths.

Five of the Nazgûl cornered Frodo and his company at Weathertop, where the Witch-king stabbed Frodo in the shoulder with the Morgul-knife, breaking off a piece of it in the Hobbit's flesh. During their assault, they mentally commanded Frodo to put on the One Ring; while wearing it, he saw them as pale figures robed in white, with "haggard hands", helmets and swords. The Witch-king was taller than the others, with "long and gleaming" hair and a crown on his helmet.

When all Nine were swept away by the waters of the river Bruinen, their horses were drowned, and the Ringwraiths were forced to return to Mordor to regroup.
The nine companions of the Fellowship of the Ring left Rivendell as the "Nine Walkers", in opposition to the Nazgûl, the "Nine Riders". The latter reappeared mounted on hideous flying beasts.

During the Battle of the Pelennor Fields, the Lord of the Nazgûl used magic, including Grond, a battering-ram engraved with evil spells, to break the gates of Minas Tirith. He was faced by Éowyn, a noblewoman of Rohan; and not far away, Merry, a hobbit of the Fellowship. Éowyn boldly called the Nazgûl a "dwimmerlaik", telling him to go if he was not deathless. He cast back his hood to reveal a crown, but the head that wore it was invisible. Merry's surreptitious stroke with an enchanted Barrow-blade brought the Nazgûl to his knees, allowing Éowyn, the niece of Théoden, to drive her sword between his crown and mantle. Thus was the Witch-king destroyed by a woman and a Hobbit, fulfilling Glorfindel's prophecy. Both weapons that pierced him disintegrated, and both assailants were stricken with the Black Breath.

After the fall of the Lord of the Nazgûl, command of Mordor's army in the field fell to Gothmog, the "lieutenant of Morgul", of unspecified race.

The remaining eight Ringwraiths attacked the Army of the West during the Battle of the Morannon. When Frodo claimed the Ring for his own in Mount Doom, Sauron, finally realizing his peril, ordered the remaining eight Nazgûl to fly to intercept him. They arrived too late: Gollum seized the Ring and fell into the Cracks of Doom, destroying the Ring. That ended Sauron's power and everything he had brought into being using it, including the Nazgûl.

Steeds 

The Nazgûl's flying steeds are given various descriptions but no name. Beregond calls them "Hell Hawks". Tolkien describes them as "fell beasts", though he also applies the adjective fell ("fierce, cruel") to other creatures throughout The Lord of the Rings – even at one point to the wizard Gandalf. In a letter, he calls the winged mounts "Nazgûl-birds". In the absence of a proper name, derivative works sometimes press "fellbeast" or "fell-beast" into service.

In the Battle of the Pelennor Fields, where the Lord of the Nazgûl rode one of the flying beasts against King Théoden of Rohan, his mount is described as: 

It is said to attack with "beak and claw". Tolkien wrote that he "did not intend the steed of the Witch-king to be what is now called a 'pterodactyl'", while acknowledging "obviously it is pterodactylic" and owed much to the "new ... mythology" [of the "Prehistoric"], and might even be "a last survivor of older geological eras."

The medievalist Marjorie Burns compares the fell beast to the Poetic Eddas flying steed Sleipnir, "Odin's eight-legged otherworldly horse". She writes that whereas Gandalf's horse Shadowfax resembles Sleipnir in his miraculous speed and in almost seeming to fly, the Nazgûl's mount actually flies but is a "negative image" of Odin's steed; and, she notes, both Odin and the Nazgûl can cause blindness.

The Witch-king of Angmar

Evil, the absence of good 

The Tolkien critic Tom Shippey writes that the Lord of the Nazgûl hovers close to being an abstraction, "a vast menace of despair ... a huge shadow", actually calling himself Death: "Old fool! This is my hour. Do you not know Death when you see it?" The scene forms, too, a picture of the "unexistence of evil", based on the Boethian philosophy that God is all-powerful, so evil is not the equal and opposite of good, but simply its absence: he forms "a huge shadow".

The real enemy 

The Episcopal priest and theologian Fleming Rutledge writes that whereas the "pale king", the invisible Witch-king of Angmar, is striving to kill Frodo, the real king, Aragorn, who has been out of sight, in disguise as a Ranger, is doing all he can to heal him: the two kings are opposites. She writes also that while the enemy visible to Gondor are the Men of Harad and the Easterlings, the real enemy is personified by the Witch-king.

Prophecy both true and false 

Julaire Andelin, in The J. R. R. Tolkien Encyclopedia, writes that prophecy in Middle-earth depended on characters' understanding of the Music of the Ainur, the divine plan for Arda, and was often ambiguous. Thus, Glorfindel's prophecy "not by the hand of man will [the Lord of the Nazgûl] fall" did not lead the Lord of the Nazgûl to suppose that he would die at the hands of a woman and a hobbit.

Shippey states that the prophecy, and the Witch-king's surprise at finding Dernhelm to be a woman, parallel the witches' statement to Macbeth that he may "laugh to scorn / The power of man, for none of woman born / Shall harm Macbeth" (Act 4, scene 1), and Macbeth's shock at learning that Macduff "was from his mother's womb / Untimely ripp'd" (as Macduff was born by Caesarean section: Act 5, scene 8). Thus, Shippey notes, despite Tolkien's stated dislike of Shakespeare's treatment of myth, he read Macbeth closely.

Significance

Development 

Tolkien began writing The Lord of the Rings with no conception of Black Riders at all. The horseman in dark clothes in the early chapter "Three is Company" was originally Gandalf; in 1938, Tolkien called the figure's transformation into a Black Rider "an unpremeditated turn". Frodo's ring, too, was simply a magic ring conferring invisibility, both in The Hobbit and early drafts of The Lord of the Rings, with no link to Sauron. However, Tolkien was at the time starting to consider the true nature of the Ring, and the idea that it had been made by the Necromancer, and drew itself or its bearer back to him. The Black Riders became Ringwraiths when the hobbit, at that time called Bingo rather than Frodo, discussed the Riders with the Elf Gildor, later in the same chapter. Over the next three years, Tolkien gradually developed the connections between the Nazgûl, the One Ring, Sauron, and all the other Rings of Power. The pieces finally all came together when Tolkien wrote "The Mirror of Galadriel", some hundreds of pages later, around the autumn of 1941.

Literary modes 

Shippey writes that the Nazgûl function at different stylistic levels or modes (as categorised by Northrop Frye in his Anatomy of Criticism) in the story. At one level, they serve simply as story elements, dangerous opponents. But, Shippey notes, the level rises from the romantic, with heroes taking on the black riders, to the mythic, giving as example the assault of Minas Tirith. The leader of the Nazgûl directs the attack on the Great Gate; he bursts the gate using both the battering-ram Grond, written with "spells of ruin", and with "words of power and terror to rend both heart and stone".

Invisible, but corporeal 

Despite his shadowiness and invisibility, Shippey writes, the Nazgûl on the Pelennor Fields also comes as close as he ever does to seeming human, having human form inside his black robes, carrying a sword, and laughing to reveal his power when he throws back his hood, revealing a king's crown on his invisible head.

Yvette Kisor, a scholar of literature, writes that while the Ringwraiths and others (like Frodo) who wear Rings of Power become invisible, they do not lose any of their corporeality, being present as physical bodies. They require, she writes, physical steeds to carry them about, and they can wield swords. She notes that only a person in a body can wield the One Ring, so the invisibility is just "a trick of sight". When Frodo, wearing the Ring, saw the Nazgûl in the "twilight world", they appeared solid, not shadowy. He also saw Glorfindel in that world, as a figure of white flame; and Gandalf explains later that the Ringwraiths were "dismayed" to see "an Elf-lord revealed in his wrath". Frodo is in danger of "fading" permanently into invisibility and the twilight world, as the Ringwraiths have done, living "in another mode of reality". She writes, too, that Merry's sword, with the special power to sever the Witch-king's "undead flesh" and in particular to overcome the "spell that knit his unseen sinews to his will", has in fact to cut through real, but invisible, sinews and flesh.

Gradual incarnation 

Steve Walker, a Tolkien scholar, writes that the story gives the Ringwraiths credibility through a "gradual incarnation of bodiless presence". Little by little, in his view, Tolkien increases the reader's insight into their nature, starting with Black Riders who are "spies more human than diabolical", rather than developing their character. Walker sees this as appropriate in psychological terms: the Nazgûl's main weapons are psychological, namely fear and despair. He writes that the progressive revelation of their capabilities, and their "escalation of steeds" from horses to fell beasts, builds up in the reader's mind an "increasingly infernal vision".

Adaptations

Films 

The Nazgûl are featured in adaptations of The Lord of the Rings on radio, film, and stage. In Ralph Bakshi's 1978 animated film version of The Lord of the Rings, the Nazgûl "shamble and limp like zombies". They hack and slash the Hobbits' beds at The Prancing Pony inn, whereas Tolkien does not identify the assailants.

In the Rankin-Bass adaptation of The Return of the King, the Nazgûl are robed skeletons with white hair. They ride winged horses, although the Witch-king rides a creature more in line with the book when he confronts Éowyn. The 1981 BBC Radio serial of The Lord of the Rings has the Nazgûl chant the Ring-inscription in the Black Speech of Mordor. The 1991 Russian television play Khraniteli features a group of Nazgûl galloping through a snowy pine forest; they wear black cloaks, with glimpses of red equipment.

In The Lord of the Rings film trilogy (2001–2003) by Peter Jackson, the Nazgûl are almost always concealed by cloaks; they attack the inn at Bree themselves. During the siege of Minas Tirith, the Witch-king wears a distinctive helmet over his hood resembling a mask and a crown, rather than the crown worn underneath his hood in the book. Their shrieks are distorted recordings of producer and screenwriter Fran Walsh's scream.

Minas Morgul is shown first in The Fellowship of the Ring, when the Nazgûl leave the city and ride towards the Shire to pursue the One Ring. It features again when Frodo and Sam make their way towards Cirith Ungol. These sets were designed by the illustrator John Howe. All nine Nazgûl are shown riding winged monsters. Jackson's monsters explicitly differ from Tolkien's description in that they have teeth instead of beaks. The Nazgûl use them in battle more extensively than in the book. In the film the Witch-king's mount is largely responsible for the death of Théoden and his horse Snowmane, a departure from the book. As confirmed in the films' audio commentary, the design of the monsters was based largely on illustrations by John Howe. 

The fan-made 2009 film The Hunt for Gollum features Aragorn fighting a Ringwraith on the borders of Mirkwood.

In Jackson's 2012–2014 The Hobbit film trilogy, the men who became the Nazgûl are said to have been buried and sealed within the invented High Fells of Rhudaur. In the first film, Radagast briefly encounters the Witch-king while investigating Dol Guldur, and gives the Nazgûl's Morgul dagger to Gandalf to present at the White Council as proof of their return. In the second film, at Galadriel's behest, Gandalf heads to the High Fells and finds that all the Nazgûl have left the tomb. This confirms the Necromancer's identity as Sauron, as the Nazgûl appear alongside their master in the third film in spectral forms wearing Morgul armour and fight Elrond and Saruman before being driven away by Galadriel.

Games 

The Nazgûl are featured in the video game Middle-earth: Shadow of Mordor and its sequel Middle-earth: Shadow of War. In the latter, Isildur is revealed to be one of the Nazgûl before he is killed by the game's protagonist, Talion. Talion takes Isildur's ring to prolong his life and eventually became Isildur's replacement until the demise of the Nazgûl in the Return of the King.
For the expansion to its real-time strategy game The Lord of the Rings: The Battle for Middle-earth II, The Rise of the Witch-king, Electronic Arts invented the name Morgomir for one of the Nazgûl.

Influence 

In taxonomy, the black ant species Tetramorium nazgul is named for Tolkien's Ringwraiths, as are the stink bug Acledra nazgul, the marine crustacean Potamalpheops nazgul, and the amphibian Abavorana nazgul. The genus of parasitoid wasps Nazgulia, type species N. petiolata, has the same origin.

The fantasy novelist George R. R. Martin's 1983 The Armageddon Rag tells the tale of a rock promoter who had managed a band named the Nazgûl, and was found ritually murdered on the 10th anniversary of the band's breakup.

Gothic rock band Trivalia released several of their albums through their own independent record label Black Rider and for a period of time issued a fanzine titled Black Rider, inspired by The Lord of the Rings.

Notes

References

Primary 
This list identifies each item's location in Tolkien's writings.

Secondary

Sources 

  
     
  
  
 
 
 
 
 

Middle-earth Men
Fictional undead
Fictional kings
Fictional swordfighters
The Lord of the Rings characters
Literary characters introduced in 1954
Male literary villains
Fictional nonets
Ring-bearers
Middle-earth monsters